Cyclin M2 is a protein in humans that is encoded by the CNNM2 gene.

This gene encodes a member of the ancient conserved domain containing protein family. Members of this protein family (CNNM1, CNNM2, CNNM3 and CNNM4) contain a cyclin box motif and have structural similarity to the cyclins. The encoded protein may play an important role in magnesium homeostasis by mediating the epithelial transport and renal reabsorption of Mg2+. Mutations in this gene are associated with renal hypomagnesemia. Alternatively spliced transcript variants encoding multiple isoforms have been observed for this gene. [provided by RefSeq, Dec 2011].

References

Further reading 

Proteins